Christophia saxauli is a species of snout moth in the genus Christophia. It was described by Mark I. Falkovitsh in 1999 and is known from Uzbekistan and Mongolia.

The larvae have been recorded feeding on Haloxylon ammodendron.

References

Moths described in 1999
Phycitini